Zale Neikha is an Indian politician from Nagaland. He was elected to the Nagaland Legislative Assembly in 2018 from Southern Angami II Assembly constituency as candidate of Nationalist Democratic Progressive Party. He was appointed the Advisor, Youth Resources and Sports (YRS) in Fourth Neiphiu Rio ministry.

Zale is a graduate from National Institute of Technology, Raipur.

References

Nagaland politicians
National Institute of Technology, Raipur alumni
Year of birth missing (living people)
Living people
People from Viswema
People from Kohima
Nationalist Democratic Progressive Party politicians
Nationalist Congress Party politicians